General Costello may refer to:

Edmund Costello (1873–1949), British Indian Army brigadier general
John P. Costello (1947–2010), U.S. Army lieutenant general
Michael Joe Costello (1904–1986), Irish Army lieutenant general